The 2021 National Women's League, also known as Deputy Mayor National Women's League  was the 2021 edition of the first-tier women's club football competition in Nepal organized by the All Nepal Football Association. The season started on 21 January. It was the first season since 2017/18, as the 2020 season was cancelled due to the COVID-19 pandemic in Nepal. APF Club was crowned champions on 17 February 2021.

Qualification 
The season was made up of the teams that qualified for the2019–20 season, which was  cancelled  due to the COVID-19 pandemic in Nepal; the three departmental teams as well as four regionally qualified teams. For the 2019–20 National Women's League season, the three departmental sports teams APF Club, Nepal Army Club, and Nepal Police Club were qualified and were joined by four local teams determined by all four semi-finalists of the Chandrapur Upa Mayor National Women's League Qualification Tournament played between Waling Municipality, Bangsgadhi Municipality, Biratnagar Metropolitan City, Birendranagar Municipality, Barhabise Municipality, Chaudandigadhi Municipality, Bidur Municipality, and Chandrapur Municipality in Chandrapur, Rautahat in February 2020.

Teams

Personnel and kits

Venues 
The league was played centrally in two venues in two cities in the Kathmandu Valley.

League table

Results

Awards

End-of-season awards

Broadcast rights
All matches were streamed live on MyCujoo.

References

External links

2020–21 in Nepalese football
Nepal